Granada Hills is a neighborhood located in southwest Austin, Texas. Granada Hills is located in ZIP code 78737. The neighborhood boundaries are FM 1826 on the south and east sides, Highway 290 and the Scenic Brook neighborhood to the north, and Southview Road and Belterra on the west side.  

Granada Hills is located in the Austin Independent School District.

References

External links
 Granada Hills Pool
 Granada Hills Neighborhood Website
 Southwest Austin News

Neighborhoods in Austin, Texas